Porwad is a village in Parbhani taluka of Parbhani district in Indian state of Maharashtra. It is located from 22 km away from district headquarter Parbhani on Parbhani-Gangakhed state highway 217.

As per 2011 census, Porwad had population of 1,747 residing in 321 houses. Average Sex Ratio of Porwad was 981 with literacy of 77.07%. Male literacy was 87.6% while female literacy was 66.22%. Schedule Caste (SC) constitutes 6.47% of total population.

References

Villages in Parbhani district